The Sharr Mountains National Park is a national park in southwestern Kosovo. It was declared a national park in 1986, and re-established in 2012 by the new Kosovan Government. The park encompasses various terrains, including glacial lakes, alpine and periglacial landscapes.

Geography

Climate 

The Sharr Mountains National Park has an alpine climate, with some continental influence.

Biodiversity 

The flora of the park is represented by 1558 species of vascular plants. The fauna includes 32 species of mammals, 200 species of birds, 13 species of reptiles, 10 species of amphibia, 7 species of fish and 147 species of butterflies.

In terms of phytogeography, the Sharr Mountains National Park belongs to the Illyrian province of the Circumboreal Region within the Boreal Kingdom. It falls entirely within the Balkan mixed forests terrestrial ecoregion of the Palearctic temperate broadleaf and mixed forests biome.

See also 
 National Parks of Kosovo
 Geography of Kosovo
 Biodiversity of Kosovo

References 

 
National parks of Kosovo
Protected areas of Prizren District